Instituto Escuela del Sur S.C. is a private middle school and high school (preparatoria) in Tlalpan, Mexico City. It opened in 1987.

References

External links
 Instituto Escuela del Sur 

High schools in Mexico City
Educational institutions established in 1987
1987 establishments in Mexico